Jean Kazandjian (born February 10, 1938) is a French artist from Armenian descent working in Paris and Los Angeles.

Biography

Through the 1970s, Kazandjian was active in the Parisian art circles where he met with painters Francis Bacon, Alexander Calder and Giorgio de Chirico.

After settling in Southern California, Kazandjian became influenced by surrealism and pop-culture.

Solo exhibitions

 2014 National Gallery of Armenia, Yerevan.

References

External links
 
 Panorama.am article
 
 WebTV Interview Yerevan 2014

1938 births
Living people
French artists
École nationale supérieure des arts décoratifs alumni
Artists from Beirut